Michael Madana Kamaraju is a 2008 Telugu comedy-drama film directed by Nidhi Prasad. It stars Srikanth, Charmy Kaur and Prabhu Deva in the lead roles. Michael Madana Kamaraju opened to mixed reviews in April 2008. It was dubbed into Hindi as Badle Ki Aag (2008).

Cast

Srikanth as Madan
Prabhu Deva as Michael / Ravi
Sunil as Kamaraju
Charmy Kaur as Archana
Asha Saini as Mandira
Kota Srinivasa Rao as Photo Studio Owner
Brahmanandam as James
Ali as Michael's friend
Venu Madhav
Kovai Sarala as Michael's fake mother
Mallikarjuna Rao
Nagendra Babu as Archana's father
Surya
Giri Babu
Jaya Prakash Reddy
Kondavalasa Lakshmana Rao as Photo Studio Owner's Assistant
L. B. Sriram
Abhinayashree as Julie
Kavita
Sangeeta
Archana
Kadambari Kiran

Production
Nidhi Prasad managed to convince Srikanth to feature in the film, despite the failure of their previous venture together. Prabhu Deva accepted to play a role in the film, without having listened to the story, while Charmy Kaur was signed to play the leading female role. The team primarily shot scenes in outdoor locations, but could not shoot abroad as a result of Nidhi Prasad's fear of flying. The team held an audio launch event in March 2008 with Suresh Babu, Nithin and Bhumika Chawla attending as chief guests.

Soundtrack

Release
The film opened to mixed reviews in April 2008. Indiaglitz.com gave the film a negative review and stated "the director failed to utilise the talents of most of the artistes by scripting casual comedy scenes all through the film", while adding he also "failed to establish many characters in the film and the audiences had to grope in the dark as to how a character had appeared on the screen and it takes time to correlate that character with the scene". Sify.com stated "there is originality and strength in the story, narration and direction", but, "the movie's length is a bit too much full with three hours" and "this will sure work against the movie's prospects".

References

2008 films
2000s Telugu-language films